Atractopyge is a genus of trilobites that lived in what would be Asia and Europe from the middle Ordovician to the early Devonian from 472 to 412.3 mya, existing for approximately .

Taxonomy 
Atractopyge was named by Hawle and Corda (1847). Jell and Adrain (2003) list it as a currently valid genus name within the Phacopida, specifically within the Encrinuridae.

Fossil distribution 
Fossil distribution is confined to the strata of the Early Llanvirn to Rawtheyan ages. Fossils have been recovered from Yunnan Province, China to the Stinchar River, United Kingdom to Ringerike, Norway.

History 
A cranidium of Atractopyge was already illustrated by the Welsh scientist Edward Lhuyd in 1698.

The species xipheres is commonly referenced as A. Xipheres (Öpik, 1937), particularly on commercial websites. However, Öpik first described the species in 1925 as Cybele xiphere (Öpik, 1925, pp. 11, fig. 1: 10, 11) and later (1937, pp. 121, fig. VII 3; XXI 3, 4) described the species as Cybele (Atractopyge) xipheres sp. nov.

References

External links
Encrinurus in the Paleobiology Database

Encrinuridae genera
Ordovician trilobites
Silurian trilobites
Devonian trilobites
Paleozoic animals of Asia
Paleozoic animals of Europe
Dapingian first appearances
Early Devonian genus extinctions